Anna Eller (born Anna Josefina Sofia Maria Fenrich von Gjurgjenovac, later Kremer, then Eller, December 24, 1887 – 1942) was an Estonian pianist. She is best known as a spouse to Heino Eller, a prominent Estonian composer and composition teacher.

Life 
Anna Eller grew up in Warsaw, Poland, studying piano in private classes with Aleksander Michałowski. In 1906 she married her first husband, Rafael R. Kremer. In 1907 she moved to Saint Petersburg to study piano at Saint Petersburg Conservatory. She enrolled in the class of Nikolai Abramychev, and graduated in 1915. In 1908 she met Heino Eller, her lover and future husband, who studied violin at the same conservatory. After her graduation in 1915 she worked as a piano teacher in Tartu. In 1920 Anna Eller married to Heino Eller.

Death 
Anna Eller was arrested by the SS in June 1942, because of her Jewish ancestry, and was later executed.

References 

1887 births
1942 deaths
People from Vas County
Estonian pianists
Musicians from Warsaw
20th-century Polish pianists
Polish women pianists
Estonian people who died in Nazi concentration camps
Executed Estonian people
20th-century Estonian musicians
Estonian Jews
20th-century women pianists